There are at least 60 current and former U.S. military installations located in Montana.  Installations listed as historical are no longer in service and may have no physical remains in the state.

Current installations 

 Ekalaka Mini-Mutes Radar Site, Carter County, Montana, el. 
 Fort William Henry Harrison, Lewis and Clark County, Montana, el. 
 Hammond Mini-Mutes Radar Site, Carter County, Montana, el. 
 Haycreek Mini-Mute Radar Site, Carter County, Montana, el. 
 Malmstrom Air Force Base, Cascade County, Montana, el.

Historical installations 

These installations are classified as historical by the U.S. Board on Geographic Names: Historical Features – Features that no longer exist on the landscape or no longer serve the original purpose.
 Camp Baker Military Reservation, Meagher County, Montana, el. 
 Camp Cooke, Fergus County, Montana, el. 
 The first U.S. Army post built in Montana on the Judith River.  Established August 1866. Disbanded June 1870. Named for General Philip St. George Cooke, the commander of the Department of the Platte at the time.
 Camp Crook, Rosebud County, Montana, el. 
 Camp Cummings, Madison County, Montana, el. 
 Camp Devin, Carter County, Montana, location unknown
 Camp Lewis, Fergus County, Montana, el. 
 Camp Loder, Garfield County, Montana, location unknown
 Camp Merritt, Rosebud County, Montana, el. 
 Camp Morris, Liberty County, Montana, el. 
 Camp Poplar River, Roosevelt County, Montana, el. 
 Camp Porter, Dawson County, Montana, el. 
 Camp Rimini, Lewis and Clark County, Montana. About 20 miles west of Helena.
 Camp Reeve, Petroleum County, Montana, el. 
 Camp Robert B Smith, Lewis and Clark County, Montana, el. 
 Cantonment Rocky Point (historical), Fergus County, Montana, el. 
 Cut Bank Air Force Station (historical), Glacier County, Montana, el. 
 Cut Bank Army Air Field (historical), Glacier County, Montana, el. 
 Fort Assinniboine (historical), Hill County, Montana, el. 
 Fort Assinniboine Military Reservation (historical), Hill County, Montana, el. 
 Fort C F Smith (historical), Big Horn County, Montana, el. 
 Fort Carroll (historical), Fergus County, Montana, el. 
 Fort Custer Military Reservation (historical), Big Horn County, Montana, el. 
 Fort Elizabeth Meagher (historical), Gallatin County, Montana, el. 
 Fort Ellis (historical), Gallatin County, Montana, el. 
 Fort Fizzle (historical), Missoula County, Montana, el. 
 Fort Fizzle is a wooden barricade on the Lolo Trail erected by Missoula volunteers to stop the advance of Chief Joseph during the Nez Perce War in 1877. The barricade failed when the Nez Perce climbed a steep ravine behind the ridge and bypassed the soldiers. The failure to stop the Nez Perce caused the barricade to be named Fort Fizzle.
 Fort Green Clay Smith (historical), Park County, Montana, el. 
 Fort Howes (historical), Powder River County, Montana, el. 
 Fort Howie (historical), Meagher County, Montana, el. 
 Established in 1867 near Martinsdale, Montana on the Musselshell River.  Disbanded in 1867.  Named for Colonel Neil Howie of the Montana Militia.
 Fort Ida Thoroughman (historical), Park County, Montana, el. 
 Fort Keogh (historical), Custer County, Montana, el. 
 Fort Logan (historical), Meagher County, Montana, el. 
 Fort Maginnis (historical), Fergus County, Montana, el. 
 Fort Maginnis Military Reservation (historical), Fergus County, Montana, el. 
 Fort Missoula (historical), Missoula County, Montana, el. 
 Fort Owen (historical), Ravalli County, Montana, el. 
 Fort Shaw (historical), Cascade County, Montana, el. 
 Fort Skalkaho (historical), Ravalli County, Montana, el. 
 Fort Thomas F Meagher (historical), Park County, Montana, el. 
 Fort William Henry Harrison (historical), Lewis and Clark County, Montana, el. 
 Glasgow Air Force Base (historical), Valley County, Montana, el. 
 Glasgow Army Air Field (historical), Valley County, Montana, el. 
 Havre Air Force Station (historical), Hill County, Montana, el. 
 Helena Barracks (historical), Lewis and Clark County, Montana, el. 
 Lewistown Air Force Station (historical), Fergus County, Montana, el. 
 Lewistown Army Air Field (historical), Fergus County, Montana, el. 
 Limestone Military Reservation (historical), Big Horn County, Montana, el. 
 Miles City Air Force Station (historical), Custer County, Montana, el. 
 National Cemetery Military Reservation (historical), Big Horn County, Montana, el. 
 Opheim Air Force Station (historical), Valley County, Montana, el. 
 Powder River Supply Depot (historical), Prairie County, Montana, el. 
 A U.S. Army steamboat landing established at the mouth of Powder River in 1876. Abandoned in 1882 when the Northern Pacific Railway reached the Powder River.
 Powder River Telegraph Station (historical), Powder River County, Montana, el. 
 A U.S. Army telegraph repair station established on the Black Hills-Fort Keogh Telegraph route in 1878. Abandoned in 1883.
 Stanley's Stockade (historical), Dawson County, Montana, el. 
 A U.S. Army advance supply depot established near present-day Glendive, Montana on the Yellowstone River in July 1873. Used by General Alfred Terry as his headquarters during the 1876 Sioux campaign.
 Yaak Air Force Station (historical), Lincoln County, Montana, el.

Further reading

Notes

Military installations
 
Military Installations
Montana
Montana